The 1977 Oregon State Beavers football team represented Oregon State University in the Pacific-8 Conference (Pac-8) during the 1977 NCAA Division I football season.  In their second season under head coach Craig Fertig, the Beavers compiled a 2–9 record (0–7 in Pac-8, last), and were outscored 303 to 173.  The team played its five home games on campus at Parker Stadium in Corvallis.

Schedule

Roster

References

Oregon State
Oregon State Beavers football seasons
Oregon State Beavers football